Frederick August Vining (4 November 1790, London–2 June 1871, Camberwell) was an English actor. His first appearance on the stage was at Gravesend, after which we worked at provincial theatres at Bath and Norwich. He went on to perform in London and was manager of the Theatre Royal, Haymarket. He was part of an extensive family of actors.

Family
He was the son of Charles Vining, a silversmith in Kirby Street, Hatton Garden in 1790. The actor George Vining was Frederick's nephew.

Career in the theatre
His first appearance was at the age of sixteen. He played Young Norval in the play Douglas at the Theatre Royal, Gravesend.

He is buried in West Norwood Cemetery.

References

19th-century English male actors
1790 births
1871 deaths